Bobby Ryan (born 23 October 1961) is an Irish former hurler. His league and championship career with the Tipperary senior team spanned thirteen seasons from 1980 to 1993.

Born in Borrisoleigh, County Tipperary, Ryan was raised in a strong hurling family. His father, Tim Ryan, and his uncles, Ned Ryan and Pat Stakelum, won All-Ireland medals with Tipperary between 1949 and 1951. 

Ryan had his first hurling successes with Templemore CBS. Here he won an All-Ireland medal in 1978. Ryan first appeared for the Borris–Ileigh club at juvenile and underage levels, before eventually joining the club's senior team. The highlight of his club career came in 1987 when he won an All-Ireland medal. Ryan also won one Munster medal and three county championship medals.

Ryan made his debut on the inter-county scene at the age of sixteen when he was selected for the Tipperary minor team. He enjoyed two championship seasons with the minor team before subsequently joining the  under-21 team with whom he won back-to-back All-Ireland medals in 1980 and 1981. By this stage Ryan had also joined the Tipperary senior team, making his debut during the 1980-81 league. Over the course of the following thirteen seasons, he won All-Ireland medals in 1989 as captain and in 1991. Ryan also won five Munster medals and one National League medal. He played his last game for Tipperary in August 1993. Ryan was joined on the Tipperary team for much of his career by his brother Aidan. 

After being chosen on the Munster inter-provincial team for the first time in 1984, Ryan was an automatic choice on the starting fifteen for the following three years. During that time he won two Railway Cup medals.

He appeared in an advertisement for veterinary medicinal product Zerofen, used to treat worms in cattle and sheep.

Honours

Team

Templemore CBS
Dr. Croke Cup (1): 1978
Dr. Harty Cup (1): 1978

Borris–Ileigh
All-Ireland Senior Club Hurling Championship (1): 1987
Munster Senior Club Hurling Championship (1): 1986
Tipperary Senior Hurling Championship (3): 1981, 1983, 1986

Tipperary
All-Ireland Senior Hurling Championship (2): 1989 (c), 1991
Munster Senior Hurling Championship (5): 1987, 1988, 1989 (c), 1991, 1993
National Hurling League (1): 1987-88
All-Ireland Under-21 Hurling Championship (2): 1980, 1981
Munster Under-21 Hurling Championship (2): 1980, 1981

Munster
Railway Cup (3): 1984, 1985, 1992

Individual

Awards
All Stars Awards (3): 1986, 1988, 1989

References

1961 births
Living people
Borris-Ileigh hurlers
Tipperary inter-county hurlers
Munster inter-provincial hurlers
All-Ireland Senior Hurling Championship winners
Irish farmers
People educated at Our Lady's Secondary School, Templemore